Lucie Hochmann (née Záleská, born 7 July 1991) is a track cyclist from the Czech Republic. She represented her nation at the 2015 UCI Track Cycling World Championships. She competed at the 2016 UEC European Track Championships in the individual pursuit event.

Major results

2010
2nd Individual Pursuit, UEC European U23 Track Championships
2012
UEC European U23 Track Championships
2nd Individual Pursuit
3rd Omnium
2013
1st Omnium, UIV Talents Cup Final (U23)
UEC European U23 Track Championships
3rd Individual Pursuit
3rd Omnium
3rd Scratch Race
2014
2nd Omnium, Grand Prix Minsk
3rd Omnium, GP Prostejov - Memorial of Otmar Malecek
Prova Internacional de Anadia
3rd Omnium
3rd Scratch Race
2015
2nd Omnium, GP Prostejov - Memorial of Otmar Malecek
2nd Omnium, Cottbuser Nächte
Trofeu Ciutat de Barcelona
2nd Points Race
3rd Scratch Race
3rd Omnium, Panevezys
2016
Grand Prix Vienna
1st Points Race
1st Scratch Race
Prostejov GP - Memorial of Otmar Malecek
1st Points Race  
3rd Scratch Race
1st Omnium, 6 giorni delle rose - Fiorenzuola
1st Scratch Race, Prilba Moravy
1st Team Pursuit, GP Czech Cycling Federation (with Jarmila Machačová, Eva Pláničková and Ema Kankovská) 
 3 Jours d'Aigle
2nd Points Race
3rd Individual Pursuit
3rd Scratch Race, Grand Prix of Poland
2017
6 Giorni di Torino internazionale 
2nd Omnium
3rd Points Race
3rd Madison, Öschelbronn (with Jarmila Machačová)

References

External links
 profile at Cyclingarchives.com

1991 births
Czech female cyclists
Living people
European Games competitors for the Czech Republic
Cyclists at the 2019 European Games